Richmond upon Thames London Borough Council is the local authority for the London Borough of Richmond upon Thames in Greater London, England. It is a London borough council, one of 32 in London, the United Kingdom capital. Richmond upon Thames is divided into 18 wards and elections for all Council seats in the borough are held every four years. The most recent election was in 2022 when the Liberal Democrats, led by Gareth Roberts, retained overall majority control of the council for a second consecutive term.

History

There have previously been a number of local authorities responsible for the Richmond upon Thames area. The current local authority was first elected in 1964, a year before formally coming into its powers and prior to the creation of the London Borough of Richmond upon Thames on 1 April 1965. Richmond upon Thames replaced the Municipal Borough of Twickenham in Middlesex, the Municipal Borough of Richmond and the Municipal Borough of Barnes, both then in Surrey.

It was envisaged that through the London Government Act 1963 Richmond upon Thames as a London local authority would share power with the Greater London Council. The split of powers and functions meant that the Greater London Council was responsible for "wide area" services such as fire, ambulance, flood prevention, and refuse disposal; with the local authorities responsible for "personal" services such as social care, libraries, cemeteries and refuse collection. As an outer London borough council it has been an education authority since 1965. This arrangement lasted until 1986 when Richmond upon Thames London Borough Council gained responsibility for some services that had been provided by the Greater London Council, such as waste disposal. Since 2000 the Greater London Authority has taken some responsibility for highways and planning control from the council, but within the English local government system the council remains a "most purpose" authority in terms of the available range of powers and functions.

Powers and functions
The local authority derives its powers and functions from the London Government Act 1963 and subsequent legislation, and has the powers and functions of a London borough council. It sets council tax and as a billing authority also collects precepts for Greater London Authority functions and business rates. It sets planning policies which complement Greater London Authority and national policies, and decides on almost all planning applications accordingly.  It is a local education authority  and is also responsible for council housing, social services, libraries, waste collection and disposal, traffic, and most roads and environmental health.

Political composition
The borough council was controlled by the Conservatives from its inception to 1983 when the Liberals and the SDP won control in a by-election.  The Council was then led by David Williams until he stood down in favour of Serge Lourie in 2001.  Between 2002 and 2006 the council was controlled by the Conservatives under Greater London Assembly member Tony Arbour.  Between 2006 and 2010 the council reverted to the Liberal Democrats under the leadership of Serge Lourie.  From 2010 to 2018 it was run by the Conservative Party, initially under Lord True and then (from 2017) led by Paul Hodgins. The Liberal Democrats, led by Gareth Roberts, won control of the council at the 2018 election and retained control in the 2022 election.

Notable former councillors
Tony Arbour, councillor for Hampton Wick ward 1968–1986 and 1994–2018, and Leader of the Council 2002–2006
David Blomfield, councillor for Kew ward  1971–1978 and 1979–1986.  As leader of the Liberal group he was Leader of the Opposition on the Council in 1978.
Ian Dalziel, councillor for Barnes ward 1978–1979 
Dee Doocey, councillor for Hampton ward 1986–1994 and chair of the council's Housing Committee
Sally Hamwee, councillor for Palewell ward 1978–1998
Stephen Knight, councillor for Teddington ward 2006–2018 and Leader of the Opposition on the Council 2010–2015
Serge Lourie, councillor for Kew ward 1982–2010; Leader of the Council 2001–2002 and 2006–2010
Tania Mathias,  councillor for Hampton Wick ward 2010–2015 
Bill Newton Dunn, councillor for South Richmond Ward 2018–2022 and previously a Member of the European Parliament
Geoff Pope, councillor for South Twickenham ward, mayor 1989–1990 and chair of the Council's Social Services Committee 
Tim Razzall, councillor for Mortlake ward  1974–1998. During that time he served as chair of the Council's Policy and Resources Committee for 13 years and as deputy leader 1983–1996.  He was succeeded in both roles by Serge Lourie.
Jenny Tonge, councillor for Kew ward 1981–1990 and chair of the Council's Social Services Committee 
Nicholas True, councillor for East Sheen ward 1986–2017 and Leader of the Council 2010–2017
 Sir David Williams, councillor for Ham, Petersham and Richmond Riverside ward 1974–2014 and Leader of the Council 1983–2001

See also
Richmond upon Thames London Borough Council elections

Notes

References

External links 
Official website

1965 establishments in England
Billing authorities in England
History of the London Borough of Richmond upon Thames
Leader and cabinet executives
Local authorities in London
Local education authorities in England
London borough councils
Politics of the London Borough of Richmond upon Thames